Gary Lee Silk (born 13 September 1984) is an English former professional footballer who is currently first team physiotherapist for Premier League side Leicester City

As a player, he was a right back who played between 2003 and 2013 for Portsmouth, Barnet, Wycombe Wanderers, Boston United, Notts County, Mansfield Town and Grimsby Town.

Career

Portsmouth
Born in Newport, Isle of Wight, Silk started his career as a youth player at Portsmouth. He made his professional debut as a player in December 2003 whilst on loan at Barnet, and since spent much of season 2004/05 on loan at Wycombe Wanderers. He was a presence in Wycombe's quarter-final Football League Trophy run of 2004–05.

Notts County
At the end of the 2005–06 season he was released by Portsmouth and joined Notts County, before being released on 13 May 2008.

Mansfield Town
He joined their neighbours Mansfield Town and soon became a fans' favourite at Field Mill. He won every player of the year award available and signed a two-year deal with the Stags despite having an offer from a Football League club.

Grimsby Town
In June 2011, he left Mansfield Town after three seasons, to join Grimsby Town, he would become Grimsby's first new signing for 2011–12. After an injury plagued season in which Silk only featured 24 times in the league he was released by the club on 3 May 2012.

Boston United
In July 2012 he joined Lincoln City on trial. In August, he signed a one-year deal with Jason Lee's Boston United. Following a managerial change at the club, new United boss Graham Drury released Silk on 12 February 2013 after his university commitments had prevented him from training on Thursday nights. Drury added "I need all my players to train on thursday nights". Silk played 26 times for The Pilgrims and made his final appearance against local rivals Gainsborough Trinity.

On 14 March it was announced on the Boston United website that Silk, whose registration had never been cancelled, was being brought back to the club by new manager Dennis Greene. Silk was released by Boston for a second time at the end of the 2012–13 season.

Personal life
Whilst playing for Mansfield, Silk gained a diploma in sports massage from Loughborough College. He gained experience by joining the medical staff at Sheffield Wednesday before being appointed first masseur at Leicester City in 2013. He graduated from the University of Salford in July 2016 with a bachelor's degree in Physiotherapy and was appointed as a physiotherapist for the first team.

Honours

Grimsby Town
 Lincolnshire Senior Cup: Winner, 2011–12

References

External links

1984 births
English footballers
Living people
Association football defenders
Association football midfielders
Portsmouth F.C. players
Wycombe Wanderers F.C. players
Barnet F.C. players
Boston United F.C. players
Notts County F.C. players
Mansfield Town F.C. players
Grimsby Town F.C. players
English Football League players
Association football utility players
People from Newport, Isle of Wight
National League (English football) players
Sheffield Wednesday F.C. non-playing staff
Leicester City F.C. non-playing staff
Association football physiotherapists
Alumni of the University of Salford